Dianna Leilani Cowern (born May 4, 1989) is an American science communicator. She is a YouTuber; she uploads videos to her YouTube channel Physics Girl explaining various physical phenomena. She worked in partnership with the PBS Digital Studios from 2015 until 2020, when she discontinued her partnership. She has collaborations with other YouTube personalities, including fellow science communicator Derek Muller of the channel Veritasium, maker Simone Giertz, and mathematics animator Grant Sanderson of 3Blue1Brown.

Early life and education 
Cowern was born May 4, 1989 and raised on Kauai island in Hawaii. At that time, her father was a tree farmer and her mother ran a bed and breakfast.

Through most of her early education Cowern was fascinated by mathematics. While in high school, she was inspired by Neil deGrasse Tyson and became interested in communicating science. She studied physics at the Massachusetts Institute of Technology, graduating in 2011 with a bachelor's degree. During her time at MIT she researched dark matter.

Career 
After graduation, Cowern was a research fellow at the Center for Astrophysics  Harvard & Smithsonian where she researched low-metallicity stars. Cowern began as outreach coordinator at University of California at San Diego's Center for Astrophysics and Space Sciences research unit. She started making science videos while working as a mobile app developer at General Electric.

She started her channel Physics Girl on October 21, 2011. In an interview with Grant Sanderson, she said that some of the earlier videos were later deleted from the channel.

Cowern has also participated in various events as a speaker. In 2015, she participated in a conference organized by the U.S. News & World Report. In February 2017, she gave a talk at Google titled "Becoming YouTube's Physics Girl". In 2018, she gave a keynote at CAST 2018 and at STEMtastic.

In December 2017, she was featured in an interview in APS News. Cowern has been featured in the Huffington Post, Slate, and Scientific American blogs.

On September 25, 2020, Dianna announced on her YouTube channel that she would be ending her five-year partnership with PBS Studios.

On June 23, 2022, Cowern announced she would be producing a science-based talk show for Curiosity Stream's Originals called Proof of Concept. The show started streaming in August 2022.

As of March 2023, she has over 221 million views on YouTube and over 2.6 million subscribers. On TikTok, in March 2023, she has over 2.8 million likes and over 176,000 followers.

Awards 
In 2014, she won the top video prize from the Alan Alda Center for Communicating Science at Stony Brook University.

In 2018, Cowern won a Webby Award for Best Web Personality. A year later she was listed in Forbes 30 under 30 in the category of education.

Personal life 
In May 2022, Cowern announced that she had recently married. 

In July 2022, Cowern began to suffer from long COVID. She was hospitalized in March 2023, as her symptoms of chronic fatigue syndrome (ME/CFS) continued to worsen.

References

External links
 
 Physics Girl Homepage

1989 births
American YouTubers
Living people
Massachusetts Institute of Technology School of Science alumni
People from Kauai
Science communicators
Science-related YouTube channels